The Serie A Awards are awarded by the Lega Serie A to the best footballers of each Italian football season.

They were first awarded at the end of the 2018–19 Serie A season.

Regulations
The Serie A Awards are awarded under the categories of Best Goalkeeper, Best Defender, Best Midfielder, Best Striker, Best Young Player (Under-23), and Most Valuable Player of a particular Serie A, Coppa Italia, and Supercoppa Italiana season.

The ranking for each category is determined through a weighted calculation elaborated by Ernst & Young, based on statistical reporting by Stats Perform and Opta Sports and supported by data tracking provided by Netco Sports.

Awards

List of winners by season

2018–19

2019–20

2020–21

2021–22

Multiple winners

References

See also
Gran Galà del Calcio
Serie A Team of the Year
Guerin d'Oro
Panchina d'Oro

Awards established in 2019
Italian football trophies and awards
Serie A trophies and awards
Serie A players
Association football player non-biographical articles